Gold Hill is an unincorporated community in Wilson Township, Pope County, Arkansas, United States.

See also

References

Unincorporated communities in Pope County, Arkansas
Unincorporated communities in Arkansas